Frédéric Adolphe Cavens (30 August 1882, Laeken, Belgium –  30 April 1962, Woodland Hills, California) was a Belgian-born fencing master who emigrated to Hollywood and worked as an actor, stuntman and fencing master from the silent film era, then in television. He trained Jean Peters in the film Anne of the Indies (1951) and Guy Williams in the television role of Zorro.

Cavens was married to Elizabeth Francoise Saymons (1886–1971); they were the parents of Albert Frederic Rene Cavins, who followed in his father's footsteps.

Filmography
Complete filmography

Director (feature film)
 The Three Must-Get-Theres (1922) as Assistant Director

Cast (feature film)

 The Three Must-Get-Theres (1922) as Bernajoux
 The Sword of Valor (1924)
 The King of Kings (1927) (uncredited)
 The Iron Mask (1929) as DeRochefort's Ruffian (uncredited)
 Breed of the Border (1933) as Mike Cavins
 The World Moves On (1934) as French taxi driver (uncredited)
 Paris Interlude (1934) as Mechanic (uncredited)
 The Count of Monte Cristo (1934) as Fencing Master (uncredited)
 The Merry Widow (1934) as Gendarme (uncredited)
 Marie Galante (1934) as Postmaster (uncredited)
 Kid Courageous (1935) as Louie - Henchman (uncredited)
 Lottery Lover (1935) as French stage doorman (uncredited)
 Folies Bergère de Paris (1935) as Airport official (uncredited)
 Love on the Run (1936) as French waiter (uncredited)
 Café Metropole (1937) as Train guard (uncredited)
 Kidnapped (1938) as Minor Role (uncredited)
 Artists and Models Abroad (1938) as Guard (uncredited)
 The Man in the Iron Mask (1939) as Francois (uncredited)
 Pack Up Your Troubles (1939) as French infantry captain (uncredited)
 Eagle Squadron (1942) as Frenchman (uncredited)
 Around the World (1943) as Instructor (uncredited)
 Ali Baba and the Forty Thieves (1944) as Thief (uncredited)
 Till We Meet Again (1944) as Carpenter (uncredited)
 The Exile (1947) as Alec - Coachman
 Fortunes of Captain Blood (1950) as Turnkey (uncredited)
 Lydia Bailey (1952) as Fencing instructor (uncredited)
 The Iron Mistress (1952) as Aged Swordsman (uncredited)
 Dreamboat (1952) as Fencer (uncredited)
 The Mississippi Gambler (1953) as Emile Maitre - Fencing Master (uncredited)
 The Robe (1953) as Sword-fighting soldier (uncredited)
 Around the World in 80 Days (1956) as Minor Role (uncredited)
 The Lost World (1960) as French member (uncredited)
 Hell Is for Heroes (1962) as Old Man (uncredited) (final film role)

Dance (feature film)
 The Three Musketeers (1935) as Dance arr.

Film Production - Main (feature film)
 Queen Christina (1933) as Sword fight staging by
 Cardinal Richelieu (1935) as Research dir
 Romeo and Juliet (1936) as Created and staged duels and sword fights
 Tower of London (1939) as Fencing instructor
 The Man in the Iron Mask (1939) as Fencing dir.
 The Black Swan (1942) as Fencing instructor
 Ali Baba and the Forty Thieves (1944) as Fencing instructor
 Don Ricardo Returns (1946) as Fencing instructor
 Forever Amber (1947) as Technical Advisor
 The Black Arrow (1948) as Fencing master
 Bagdad (1949) as Technical Advisor
 Adventures of Don Juan (1949) as Fencing instructor
 Buccaneer's Girl (1950) as Fencing instructor
 Cyrano de Bergerac (1951) as Fencing master
 Anne of the Indies (1951) as Jean Peters' fencing instructor
 Lydia Bailey (1952) as Fencing instructor.
 Dreamboat (1952) as Clifton Webb's fencing instructor
 Son of Ali Baba (1952) as Fencing coach
 The Mississippi Gambler (1953) as Fencing tech adv.
 The Robe (1953) as Fencing instructor
 Casanova's Big Night (1954) as Supv of dueling scenes
 The Vagabond King (1956) as Technical Advisor

References

External links
 Zorro

1882 births
1962 deaths
Belgian male fencers
Belgian male actors
Belgian emigrants to the United States